On the UK rail network, multiple working is where two or more traction units (locomotives, diesel multiple units or electric multiple units) are coupled together in such a way that they are all under the control of one driver (multiple-unit train control).

If the front locomotive of a pair in multiple has failed the driver can still control the rear locomotive for as long as air and electricity supplies are available on the failed locomotive.
In tandem is when more than one diesel or electric locomotive are hauling a single train and under the control of a driver on each locomotive.

Locomotives

In the early days of diesel locomotives in the 1960s, locomotives worked within their class (i.e. two locomotives of the same class could work together but not with other classes). Locomotives from different manufacturers had varying methods of controlling engines or braking systems. If a train required more than one locomotive, an additional driver was needed, at extra expense.

Since then, locomotives have been built to work with other locomotives in the same code or system. Similar systems are assigned a coupling code, which is normally indicated on the front of the locomotive.

Early diesels were also fitted with communicating doors in the nose which allowed the secondman to access the train heating boiler of the rearmost locomotive. The doors actually saw little use and, as they frequently caused draughts in the cab, many of them were later welded shut.

Multiple units

First-generation

First-generation diesel multiple units had the additional problem of differing types of transmission. For instance, a Class 127 unit (hydraulic transmission) could be required to work in multiple with a Class 112 unit (mechanical transmission). For this reason, the drive selector on the Class 127 was fitted with positions marked "D, 3, 2, 1" to change the gears when working in formation with vehicles with mechanical transmission.

First-generation DMU coupling codes:

Second-generation
Most second-generation units built by British Rail were designed to use the BSI multiple working system, including members of the 14x Pacer and 15x Sprinter families. Some post-privatisation trains such as the Class 168, 170 and 172s were fitted with BSI couplers enabling them to operate in multiple with older stock, while other incompatible systems emerged. Examples included Dellner-couplers fitted to Class 171, 220, 221, 222, 350, 360, 375, 376, 377, 390, 700 and 710s while Scharfenbergs were fitted to Class 175 and 180s. Franchise changes and stock reallocation means that many train operating companies use fleets with a number of incompatible multiple working systems.

See also
 Multiple-unit train control

References and sources

References

Sources

Rail transport operations
Rail transport in the United Kingdom